The U-229 is a cable connector currently used by the U.S. military for audio connections to field radios, typically for connecting a handset. There are five-pin and six-pin versions, the sixth pin version using the extra pin to power accessories. This type of connector is also used by the National Security Agency to load cryptographic keys into encryption equipment from a fill device.

It is specified by the detail specification MIL-DTL-55116D .

External links
 U-229 pin-outs and information
 MIL-DTL-55116 military specification
 Compilation of military radio related standards

Military radio systems of the United States
National Security Agency encryption devices
Electrical signal connectors
Military equipment introduced in the 1970s